Asad Muhammad Khan (born September 26 , 1932) is a Pakistani novelist, playwright, songwriter, and poet. He is author of five Urdu story books. He wrote songs, plays and features for Radio Pakistan and PTV. He received the Tamgha-e-Imtiaz Award in 2009.

Early life and education
Khan was born on September 26, 1932 in Bhopal , British India . In 1950, he migrated to Pakistan and settled first in Lahore and then permanently in Karachi. He completed his secondary school education in Bhopal in 1949. Later, he graduated from Sindh Muslim Government Arts & Commerce College, Karachi.

Literary career
Khan has authored nine collections of short stories and a handful of television plays. His first book, "Khhirki Bhar Aasman" was published in 1982. His book "The Harvest of Anger and Other Stories", a collection of his short stories, has been published in English translation, in 2002. Though he wrote his first fictional work, Basauday ki Maryam, a little later in his career, it is regarded one of his best works to date.

He has penned some popular songs for Radio Pakistan and PTV like, "Zameen ki goud rang se umang se bhari rahay", "Anokha ladla khelan ko mangay chaand", "Tum sung nainan laagay" and others.

Books
 1982 - Khhirki Bhar Aasman (Stories and Poems)
 1990 - Burj e Khamoshan (Stories)
 1997 - Rukay Hue Sawan (songs)
 1997 - Ghussay Ki Nai Fasal (stories)
 2002 - The Harvest of Anger and Other Stories (English translation of 21 stories)
 2003 - Narbada Aur Dosri Kahaniyan (Stories)
 2005 - Jo Kahaniyan Likhein
 2006 - Teesray Pehar Ki Kahaniyan (stories)
 2010 - Aik Tukra Dhoop Ka (12 fictional stories)
 2016 - Tukron Mein Kahi Gayi Kahaniyan (Fiction)

Songs
 Anokha Ladla Khelan Ko Maangay Chaand, sung by Bilqees Khanum
 Zameen Ki Goud Rang Se Umang Se Bhari Rahay, sung by Muhammad Ifrahim
 Tum Sung Nainan Laagay, sung by Rubina Badar

Awards and recognitions
Khan received following awards during his literary career:
 2003 - National Literary Award by Pakistan Academy of Letters 
 2004 - Ahmad Nadeem Qasmi Award for Fiction Pakistan  
 2007 - Majlas e Faroogh e Adab Award, Doha, Qatar   
 2009 - Tamgha-e-Imtiaz 
 2019 - Kamal-e-Fun Award by Pakistan Academy of Letters
 2019 - Life Time Achievement Award by the Arts Council of Pakistan, Karachi

References

1932 births
living people
People from Bhopal
Urdu-language poets from Pakistan
Urdu-language fiction writers
Pakistani television writers
Pakistani novelists
Pakistani dramatists and playwrights
Pakistani male short story writers